Professor Earl David Rainville (5 November 1907 – 29 April 1966) taught in the Department of Engineering Mathematics at the University of Michigan, where he began as an assistant professor in 1941. He studied at the University of Colorado, receiving his B.A. there in 1930 before going on to graduate studies at Michigan, where he received his Ph.D. in 1939 under the supervision of Ruel Churchill.

He was the author of several textbooks.

Books
Linear Differential Invariance Under an Operator Related to the Laplace Transformation, Univ. of Michigan, 1940, reprinted from American Journal of Mathematics, vol. 62. (Rainville's Ph.D. thesis.)
Intermediate Course in Differential Equations, Chapman & Hall, 1943.
Analytic Geometry, with Clyde E. Love, Macmillan, 1955.
Special Functions, Macmillan, 1960.
Unified Calculus and Analytic Geometry, Macmillan, 1961.
Differential and Integral Calculus, with Clyde E. Love, Macmillan, 1962.
Laplace Transform: An Introduction, 1963.
Intermediate Differential Equations, Macmillan, 1964.
Infinite Series, Macmillan, 1967.
Elementary Differential Equations, with Phillip E. Bedient, Macmillan, 1969. Eighth edition published by Prentice Hall, 1997, .
A Short Course in Differential Equations, with Phillip E. Bedient, Macmillan, 1969.

See also 
Rainville polynomials

References

1907 births
1966 deaths
20th-century American mathematicians
University of Colorado alumni
University of Michigan alumni
University of Michigan faculty
American textbook writers